Gilbertus Happart (also recorded as Gillis or Gilbert Happart) was a seventeenth-century Dutch missionary to Formosa (now known as Taiwan). He was stationed in the village of Favorlang (modern-day Huwei) and wrote a dictionary of the Favorlang language of the inhabitants.

References

Year of birth missing
1653 deaths
Dutch Protestant missionaries
People from Goes
People of Dutch Formosa
Dutch lexicographers
Protestant missionaries in Taiwan
Missionary linguists